Tollywood films of 1960 may refer to:
 Bengali films of the 1960
 Telugu films of 1960